This is a list of schools run by the Society of the Divine Word.

Americas

List of schools run by the Society of the Divine Word (SVD) in Argentina
 Colegio Guadalupe in Buenos Aires
 Instituto Verbo Divino in Pilar
 Instituto José Manuel Estrada in Rafael Calzada
 Instituto Superior Verbo Divino in Posadas, Misiones

List of schools run by the Society of the Divine Word (SVD) in Brazil

 Colégio Arnaldo Anchieta in Belo Horizonte-MG, Brazil
 Colégio Arnaldo Funcionários in Belo Horizonte-MG, Brazil 
 Colégio Cristo Redentor - Academia de Comércio in Juiz de Fora-MG, Brazil
 Colégio Verbo Divino in Barra Mansa-RJ, Brazil
 Faculdade Arnaldo College in Belo Horizonte-MG, Brazil
 Centro de Ensino Superior - JF College in Juiz de Fora-MG, Brazil

List of schools run by the Society of the Divine Word (SVD) in Chile
 Colegio del Verbo Divino (The Divine Word School) in Santiago, Chile
 Liceo Alemán del Verbo Divino (The Divine Word School) in Los Ángeles, Chile

List of schools run by the Society of the Divine Word (SVD) in the United States
 Divine Word College – Epworth, Iowa

Asia

List of schools run by the Society of the Divine Word (SVD) in China and Taiwan
 Fu Jen Catholic University in Taiwan
 Sing Yin Secondary School in Hong Kong

List of schools run by the Society of the Divine Word (SVD) in India
 St. Arnold's School, Bhubaneswar
 St. Arnold's School, Rourkela
 St. Arnold's Central school, Wadgaonsheri, Pune
 St. Arnold's Matriculation School, Trichy
 St. Arnold's High school, Medak, Telangana
 St. Arnold's High School, Ramachandrapuram
 St. Arnold's High School, Toopran
 St. Arnold's High School and Junior college [Andheri], [Mumbai]
 St. Claire High School, Ramagundam, Telangana
 St. Joseph's High School, Patancheru
 St. Lawrence School, Angul, Odisha
 St. Mary's PSM High School, Sadasivpet
 St. Mary's High School, Zaheerabad
 St. Paul's School, Rourkela
 St. Theresa's High School, Bandra, Mumbai
 New Orissa High School, Gaibira Sundargarh, Odisha
 New Orissa Higher Secondary School, Gaibira Sundargarh, Odisha

List of schools run by the Society of the Divine Word (SVD) in Indonesia
 SVD Kindergarten in Bali
 SVD Elementary School in Bali
 SVD Secondary School in Bali
 SVD High School in Bali

List of schools run by the Society of the Divine Word (SVD) in Japan
 Nanzan University in Nagoya
 Nanzan Elementary School (Nagoya)
 Nanzan Boys Junior / Senior High School (Nagoya)
 Nanzan Girls Junior / Senior High School (Nagoya)
 Seirei Girls Junior / Senior High School (Seto) run by the Steyler sisters: (Sister Servants of the Holy Spirit)Seirei Women's Junior College, Akita Prefecture

List of schools run by the Society of the Divine Word (SVD) in the Philippines
Divine Word College of Bangued – Bangued, Abra
Divine Word College of Laoag – Gen. Segundo Ave., Laoag City
Divine Word College of Urdaneta – Urdaneta, Pangasinan
Divine Word College of Vigan – Vigan, Ilocos Sur
Divine Word College of Legazpi – Rizal Street, Legazpi, Albay
Divine Word College of Calapan – Calapan, Oriental Mindoro
Divine Word College of San Jose – San Jose, Occidental Mindoro
Divine Word Academy of Dagupan – Rizal Ext., Dagupan, Pangasinan
Divine Word High School – Dana-ili, Abulug, Cagayan
Divine Word High School – Sanchez-Mira, Cagayan
Academy of St.Joseph – Claveria, Cagayan
Divine Word Formation Center – Don Filemon Sotto Drive, Cebu City
Divine Word Formation Center – Bayaoas, Urdaneta, Pangasinan
Divine Word Seminary – Tagaytay City
Divine Word Mission Seminary – 101 E. Rodriguez Sr., Blvd., Quezon City
Divine Word School of Theology – Tagaytay City
Divine Word University (DWU) – Tacloban City – closed in 1995; re-opened as Liceo del Verbo Divino
Holy Name University (formerly Holy Name College; also Divine Word College of Tagbilaran) – Tagbilaran City
University of San Carlos – Cebu City, Cebu
Saint Jude Catholic School (Chinese School) – San Miguel, Manila

References

About the SVDs
CEAP Member Schools

External links 
 About DWC

Divine Word Missionaries Order
SVD Schools
SVD Schools